Cogload Junction is a railway junction in Durston, Somerset, England. It is where the 1906-opened London to Penzance Line via Castle Cary joins the original line that runs via Bristol Temple Meads. A flyover was constructed in 1931 converting it into a flying junction.

Location
It lies alongside the Bridgwater and Taunton Canal.

History

The Bristol and Exeter Railway was opened through  on 1 July 1842.

At this time an ordinary double-track flat junction was provided, which meant that down trains running from Bristol to Taunton could be delayed by up trains from Taunton to Castle Cary crossing in front of them. In 1931 work was undertaken to convert it to a flying junction which would then allow the down Bristol trains to cross over the up Castle Cary route without conflict. This allowed the tracks to be moved to a new alignment to give space for the construction of the embankment for the down Bristol line. The completed layout with the flyover was brought into use on 15 November. The four tracks were (from north to south): up Bristol, up Castle Cary, down Castle Cary, down Bristol. No physical junction then existed between the two routes at Cogload, but on 8 July 1934 a connection was installed that allowed down trains from Bristol to be switched onto down Castle Cary line at Cogload; and on 25 October 1942 a similar connection was put in to allow up Bristol trains to use the Castle Cary line from Taunton to Cogload. These connections allowed fast Bristol trains to overtake slower trains that called at Creech St Michael Halt which only had platforms on the outer (Bristol) tracks.

On 29 March 1986 the two Bristol lines were taken out of use between Cogload and Taunton, returning the line to its original two tracks. The following weekend saw Cogload signal box closed on 5 April, and the points and signals were then operated from Exeter Panel Signal Box.

Flyover
 
 
In 1931 two embankments were built.  A long, shallow one alongside the down Bristol line between Durston railway station and Cogload; and a shorter, steeper one alongside the down Castle Cary line to bring trains back to ground level before the line passes beneath the road bridge at Charlton, a short distance east of the junction.  Between the two embankments is a large steel Warren truss girder bridge.

The two trusses are asymmetrical and different sizes as the bridge is constructed on the skew due to the angle that the two lines make to each other. Vertical suspenders are attached to alternate cross-girders, which are spaced at  centres. These support two longitudinal bearers beneath the rails, above which is a steel deck. The whole steelwork weighs .

References 

Rail transport in Somerset
Great Western Railway
Rail junctions in England